Max Carlos (31 December 1935 – 12 May 1996) was an Australian boxer. He competed in the men's light welterweight event at the 1956 Summer Olympics.

References

1935 births
1996 deaths
Australian male boxers
Olympic boxers of Australia
Boxers at the 1956 Summer Olympics
People from Shepparton
Light-welterweight boxers